Mystic Timbers is a wooden roller coaster located at Kings Island in Mason, Ohio. Constructed by Great Coasters International and designed by Skyline Design, the roller coaster opened in the park's Rivertown section on April 15, 2017. During its marketing campaign, the ride's finale element in an enclosed shed was kept secret until the ride's debut. In the annual Golden Ticket Awards by Amusement Today, it was awarded "Best New Ride" in 2017.

History

Kings Island officials began dropping hints during the 2016 operating season, which teased the possibility of a new, future attraction. In the park's Rivertown section, a construction wall was built displaying signs that stated, "Caution - Watch For Falling Trees". In June 2016, a set of plans labeled "Kings Island Project 2017" was submitted to the Mason planning board with designs for a new roller coaster. Until then, early speculation from enthusiasts believed that another possibility was a larger log flume to complement the nearby Race For Your Life Charlie Brown attraction. Later that month, media outlets in the area received a toy axe with an attached note hinting about activity in Rivertown. The following month, another clue surfaced, consisting of a blue toy pickup truck with a bundle of logs in the back. It contained a note stating that an official announcement would occur in the park on the evening of July 28, 2016.

On the night of the announcement, more than 1,000 park guests lined up two hours in advance to attend the evening event inside the park. It was revealed that the new attraction would be a roller coaster named Mystic Timbers. The new ride would mark the park's sixteenth roller coaster and fourth wooden roller coaster overall.

The ride's logo was unveiled as well, along with a simulated POV video of the ride. However, the simulation stopped short of revealing what happens when the train enters an enclosed shed near the end of the ride. Park officials indicated that the finale's details would not be revealed until opening day. The level of anticipation surrounding its debut put Mystic Timbers on USA Today'''s top nine list for most anticipated roller coasters of 2017.

Vertical construction of Mystic Timbers began in August 2016. On March 20, 2017, the ride performed its first test runs. The attraction opened for the press on April 13, 2017, allowing roller coaster enthusiasts and members of the media to ride early.

Characteristics
Mystic Timbers is themed around a fictional logging company, Miami River Lumber, that purchased the surrounding land for its timber. The company planned to use the adjacent Kings Island & Miami Valley Railroad – the park's steam locomotive attraction – for shipping the timber out. However, an unexplained series of events led to the shutdown of the company, as the land was taken over by rampant natural growth.

The attraction was designed and built by Great Coasters International, a Pennsylvania-based company that specializes in the construction and restoration of wooden roller coasters. It features a  drop and sixteen airtime hills. Its three trains each carry 24 passengers, resulting in a total capacity of approximately 1200 riders per hour. The roller coaster's track layout utilizes the terrain and interacts with both the Kings Island & Miami Valley Railroad and White Water Canyon attractions during its roughly two-minute ride cycle.

Ride experience

 Queue 
The queue begins with a sign at the main entrance displaying "Miami River Lumber Co." along with a checkpoint themed for shipping/receiving lumber. It features a vintage GMC Truck that appears to have crashed into one of the sign's pillars. Music from the truck and a man speaking about the backstory of the ride is played. A message also plays occasionally "Do not enter. Mandatory and ongoing lockdown is in effect for the Miami River Lumber Company. Repeat, do not enter." Throughout the entire queue, most of the rails are made of wood, adding to the theme. At the beginning of the queue, the path is very windy and features television screens showing security cameras of the woods. One clip shows two people exploring. Another clip shows a security guard running off screen from being frightened by something in the woods. Otherwise, the screens display the woods as if security is searching for something. The queue leads toward the back of the station and then returns to the front depending on the number of guests waiting to ride. It eventually leads to a staircase that takes riders up to the station. Riders will take a left into the station, which contains many props that resemble a lumber workspace. Throughout the queue and in the station, riders will hear spooky instrumental music.

 Layout 
The ride begins with the train leaving the station, upon which it makes an S-turn to the right, crossing over the railroad, then to the left, before climbing the lift hill. Upon latching on to the lift hill chain, a pre-recorded voice chastises the riders saying, "Hey! Hey! I see you up there! What on Earth do you think you're doing? This is security. Seriously, guys, you need to take that truck, go home to your video games. This place is not safe." Cresting the 109 foot lift hill, the chain slows again so that another pre-recorded voice can tell the riders over loudspeakers, "Whatever you do, don't go in the shed!" At the top, the train makes a swooping 98 foot drop to the left, before rising over another hill. At the crest of this second hill, the train makes another left turn and crosses over the lift hill, before diving close to the ground and traveling over a series of airtime hills. The track briefly enters a covered tunnel as it makes a left-hand turn to change directions and return towards the station. The return track runs mostly parallel to the outbound track until near the second drop, where it veers away to hit a brake run, coming to a stop outside the entrance to the shed.

The Shed
Themed by Daniels Wood Land in Paso Robles California 
Upon stopping on the brake run, a pre-recorded audio segment is heard. A security guard is heard saying, "Don't go in the shed. This is a restricted area." The audio loops several times and begins to glitch and skip, eventually changing to, "Go in the shed." The train proceeds slowly into the shed, which is only dimly-illuminated by flickering overhead lamps and fluorescent lights. After passing through the storage tracks, the train comes to a stop approximately where the shed crosses over the railroad once again. In this room, an assortment of saws, vines, leaves, a Coca-Cola vending machine, and other items left behind by workers are visible. A cassette player starts playing music from the 1980s until a loud screeching sound is heard. Projection screens show one of three random creatures, followed by a 90° turn to the right as the train re-enters the station.

 Bats: A large group of bats swoop at the train followed by a giant one that swarms the middle of the screen. 
 Snake: A huge snake appears on the screen and appears to take a biting lunge at riders.
 Tree: First, a swarm of insects can be seen crawling on some tree branches. Next, a giant tree comes alive giving the illusion of grabbing the train as it passes by.

Awards
In 2017, Mystic Timbers was awarded "Best New Ride" by Amusement Today'' in their annual Golden Ticket Awards publication. Overall, it was ranked eleventh among all wooden roller coasters.

References

External links
 Official site

Roller coasters in Ohio
Best New Ride winners
Roller coasters operated by Cedar Fair